Urko Rafael Pardo Goas (born 28 January 1983) is a retired professional footballer who last played as a goalkeeper for Olympias Lympion.

Formed at Barcelona, he spent most of his career in the Cypriot First Division, mainly with APOEL with which he won eight titles including five league championships. He also competed professionally in Greece and Romania.

After being awarded citizenship, Pardo represented the Cyprus national team.

Club career

Barcelona
Born in Brussels to a Basque father and a Galician mother, Pardo began his football career with R.S.C. Anderlecht, finishing his formation with FC Barcelona but never making it past its B-side. He split the 2005–06 season – always on loan – between FC Cartagena and CE Sabadell FC with both teams in the third division, suffering relegation with the latter.

Rapid București / Greece
In the summer of 2007, released by Barcelona, Pardo signed with Greece's Iraklis Thessaloniki FC, moving the following year to FC Rapid București in Romania but appearing rarely in his first season.

In 2009–10, another loan ensued as Pardo moved to Olympiacos F.C. also in Greece, playing just three Superleague games in his first year. The move was extended by Rapid for the following season, and he appeared more regularly (Olympiacos were seeking a replacement for the legendary Antonios Nikopolidis (40), who was set to retire in June 2011, and said the Spaniard would be a very good choice for succeeding him), being the most used player in his position.

Cyprus
In the last day of the 2011 summer transfer window, Pardo signed a two-year contract with Cyprus champions APOEL FC. He made his official debut on 19 October against FC Porto, replacing injured Dionisis Chiotis early into the second half of a 1–1 away draw in that season's UEFA Champions League, and added a further four appearances as the club reached the quarter-finals for the first time ever.

In 2014–15, Pardo appeared in every group stage match in APOEL's third Champions League campaign. On 26 May 2016 both parties agreed on a two-year contract extension, with an option for a third year.

On 2 September 2017, aged 34, free agent Pardo joined Alki Oroklini. On 23 August 2019, he moved to Cypriot Second Division team Ermis Aradippou FC. Pardo joined Cypriot Third Division team Olympias Lympion for the 2020–21 season.

International career
In 2017, Pardo became a naturalized Cypriot citizen. He won his first cap on 13 November of that year at the age of 34, in a 3–2 away friendly defeat against Armenia.

Career statistics

Honours
Olympiacos
Superleague Greece: 2010–11

APOEL
Cypriot First Division: 2012–13, 2013–14, 2014–15, 2015–16, 2016–17
Cypriot Cup: 2013–14, 2014–15
Cypriot Super Cup: 2013

Ermis Aradippou
Cypriot Second Division: 2019–20

Notes

References

External links
APOEL official profile
Cyprus Football Association profile

1983 births
Living people
Belgian people of Spanish descent
Cypriot people of Spanish descent
People of Basque descent
Belgian emigrants to Cyprus
Footballers from Brussels
Belgian footballers
Spanish footballers
Cypriot footballers
Association football goalkeepers
Segunda División B players
Tercera División players
FC Barcelona C players
FC Barcelona Atlètic players
FC Cartagena footballers
CE Sabadell FC footballers
Super League Greece players
Iraklis Thessaloniki F.C. players
Olympiacos F.C. players
Liga I players
FC Rapid București players
Cypriot First Division players
Cypriot Second Division players
APOEL FC players
Alki Oroklini players
Ermis Aradippou FC players
Cyprus international footballers
Belgian expatriate footballers
Spanish expatriate footballers
Expatriate footballers in Greece
Expatriate footballers in Romania
Expatriate footballers in Cyprus
Belgian expatriate sportspeople in Romania
Belgian expatriate sportspeople in Cyprus